Bradfordville is an unincorporated community in northern Leon County, Florida, United States. Its elevation is 223 feet (68 m).

Geography 
Bradfordville has rolling hills and ravines spotted with lakes and ponds. Lake Iamonia, one of Florida's larger natural lakes, is northwest of Bradfordville. Bradfordville is within the noted Red Hills Region.

Demographics

2020 census

As of the 2020 United States census, there were 19,183 people, 7,114 households, and 5,833 families residing in the CDP.

History
Bradfordville began as a settlement between 1829 and 1832 when the Bradford brothers moved to the area from around Enfield, Halifax County, North Carolina to farm large tracts of land.

The Bradfords were direct descendants of William Bradford, governor of the Plymouth Colony (Massachusetts). William's great-great-grandson, John Bradford, received a land grant located in Halifax County, North Carolina from King George III of Great Britain. The mother of the Bradford sons, Sarah Cromwell Bradford, was a direct descendant of Oliver Cromwell.

Bradfords and plantations
Thomas Anderson Bradford, born February 13, 1790, founded Walnut Hill Plantation 
Dr. William H. Bradford established Edgewood Plantation and became the doctor for Pine Hill Plantation's slaves
Henry B. Bradford born October 30, 1791, lived a little further south on what is now Thomasville Road in the same area as brother Thomas. 
Dr. Edward Bradford, born August 2, 1798, founded Pine Hill Plantation. The most successful brother, he later founded Horseshoe Plantation east-southeast of Lake Iamonia. The plantation is still in existence today as a privately run hunting preserve. 
Richard Henry Bradford born November 15, 1800, founded Water Oak Plantation near Lake McBride

Another planter, Captain William Lester, from Georgia, moved to Leon County and established a very successful and large plantation called Oaklawn Plantation.

The Bradfordville School was constructed between the years 1884–1892 on a small piece of land owned by the Lester family. The school, a wood-framed vernacular structure, represents a typical one-room schoolhouse mentioned in rural American history. It qualifies for the National Register and has been preserved and now resides on the southwest section of Bannerman Road.

In 1886, a T. Hardenburgh established a broom factory in Bradfordville. Hardenburgh planted  of broom corn while Col. John R. Bradford planted  and another farmer planted . The  combined supplied the factory with enough material to keep it in operation for a year.

In the early 1900s, Bradfordville had two general stores, a justice of the peace (Judge Whitehead), and a Saturday meat market ran by Tommy Carr. Greene Johnson ran a trading post that supplied staple goods like sugar and flour. Today that building, after restoration, is an animal hospital.

Bradfordville is now an area with a few large homes and is at the east-southeast tip of the large housing development of Killearn Lakes Plantation. It is mostly a major commercial area that contains Lawton Chiles High School, 4 branch banks, 3 major retail stores (Target, Publix, Walgreens) plus a variety of other smaller retail stores.

The proposed Red Hills Coastal Parkway, a tolled eastern bypass of Tallahassee, would have its northern terminus in Bradfordville.

Natural history 
Bradfordville is located in a forested area of longleaf pine, shortleaf pine, loblolly pine, laurel oak, Southern live oak, chalk maple, Southern magnolia, and sweetgum. Wildlife in the area includes the endangered red-cockaded woodpecker, wood stork, osprey, northern bobwhite, and gopher tortoises.

Political

Schools
Lawton Chiles High School
Deerlake Middle School
Killearn Lakes Elementary

References

External links 
1940 Bradfordville map
1940 map of the old community of Iamonia

Unincorporated communities in Leon County, Florida
History of Leon County, Florida
Tallahassee metropolitan area
Unincorporated communities in Florida